Parliamentary elections were held in Laos on 24 August 1947 to elect members of the National Assembly, the lower chamber of Parliament. The elections were held on a non-partisan basis, with all candidates running as independents.

References

Laos
Elections in Laos
Parliamentary election
Non-partisan elections
Election and referendum articles with incomplete results